Judge Noonan

Gregory Francis Noonan (1906–1964), judge of the United States District Court for the Southern District of New York
John T. Noonan Jr. (1926–2017), judge of the United States Court of Appeals for the Ninth Circuit